Admiral Berkeley may refer to:

George Cranfield Berkeley (1753–1818), British Royal Navy admiral
James Berkeley, 3rd Earl of Berkeley (aft. 1679–1736), British Royal Navy vice admiral
John Berkeley, 3rd Baron Berkeley of Stratton (1663–1697), English admiral
Maurice Berkeley, 1st Baron FitzHardinge (1788–1867), British Royal Navy admiral
William Berkeley (Royal Navy officer) (1639–1666), British Royal Navy vice admiral